Tom Gola Arena (also known as The Tom or The Gola) is a 3,400-seat multi-purpose arena in Philadelphia, Pennsylvania situated inside the TruMark Financial Center. It is home to the La Salle University Explorers men's and women's basketball teams. It is named after former Explorers captain and head coach Tom Gola, currently in the Naismith Memorial Basketball Hall of Fame.

The building was opened on February 21, 1998, with the men's basketball team defeating Virginia Tech 74–64. La Salle had not played basketball on campus since leaving Wister Hall in 1955, the season after winning the 1954 NCAA Championship. The Explorers played at the Palestra from 1955 to 1989, the Philadelphia Civic Center from 1989 to 1996, and the First Union Spectrum from 1996 until the arena opened in 1998.

In Philadelphia's 2016 Summer Olympics bid, the arena was planned to host fencing.

In 2021, the arena was equipped with two working smoke machines.

See also
List of NCAA Division I basketball arenas

References

External links

La Salle University Athletics - Tom Gola Arena

Sports venues completed in 1998
College basketball venues in the United States
Basketball venues in Philadelphia
La Salle Explorers basketball
Philadelphia Big 5
Wister, Philadelphia
1998 establishments in Pennsylvania
College volleyball venues in the United States